Ricardo López (born 24 May 1977) is a three time IPSC revolver World Champion (2008, 2011, 2014) from Ecuador.

References 

IPSC shooters
IPSC World Shoot Champions
1977 births
Living people